Verdon Joseph Thomas Chettleburgh (19 November 1912 – 4 September 1960) was a New Zealand cricketer. He played nineteen first-class matches for Otago between 1932 and 1941.

Tom Chettleburgh attended Otago Boys' High School in Dunedin and worked as a bookkeeper. He made his highest first-class score in Otago's victory over Canterbury in the 1936-37 Plunket Shield, when he scored 39 (the top score in Otago's first innings) and 84. He was later a member of the board of the New Zealand Cricket Council. He died in 1960 at Lower Hutt; an obituary was published in the New Zealand Cricket Almanack.

References

External links
 

1912 births
1960 deaths
People educated at Otago Boys' High School
New Zealand cricketers
Otago cricketers
Cricketers from Dunedin